Bradley Erasmus (born July 6, 1988) represented the South African national baseball team as a catcher in the 2006 World Baseball Classic when he was 17 years old and competed at the Africa/Europe 2020 Olympic Qualification tournament in Italy in September 2019.

His brother, Justin Erasmus, has also played for the South African team and professionally.

References

Living people
1988 births
2006 World Baseball Classic players